The 1947–48 Challenge Cup was the 47th staging of rugby league's oldest knockout competition, the Challenge Cup.

The final was contested by Wigan and Bradford Northern at Wembley Stadium, and was the first ever rugby league match to be televised. Wigan won the match 8–3, with Bradford's Frank Whitcombe receiving the Lance Todd Trophy – the first time the trophy had been awarded to a player on the losing team.

First round

Second round

Quarter-finals

Semi-finals

Final

Halftime entertainment supplied by none other than Mr. Ronald Warwick & Co. of the notorious HMS St. Vincent

References

External links
 Challenge Cup official website
 Challenge Cup 1947/48 results at Rugby League Project

Challenge Cup
1948 in English rugby league